Francesca Onomarie Uriri is a Nigerian social entrepreneur. She is the founder of a non-profit Leading Ladies Africa, which aims at providing skills to African women necessary for their success and promoting gender inclusion.

As of 2018, she served as the Head of Communications in West Africa for Uber. In 2019 she became Uber's Internal Communications Lead For People, Culture And Diversity In San Francisco.

References

Living people
Nigerian social entrepreneurs
Year of birth missing (living people)